God's Country and the Man is a 1937 American Western film directed by Robert North Bradbury and written by Robert Emmett Tansey. The film stars Tom Keene, Betty Compson, Charlotte Henry, Charles King, Billy Bletcher and James Sheridan. The film was released on September 2, 1937, by Monogram Pictures.

Plot
Cowboy Jim Reid and his friends go investigate the murder of Jim's father, however while doing that they find a vein of gold. The killer also finds about the vein and comes back to take it.

Cast           
Tom Keene as Jim Reid
Betty Compson as Roxey Moore
Charlotte Henry as Betty Briggs
Charles King as Red Gentry 
Billy Bletcher as Sandy Briggs 
James Sheridan	as Pete 
Eddie Parker as Bill Briggs
Bob McKenzie as Ed 
Merrill McCormick as Brokaw

References

External links
 

1937 films
1930s English-language films
American Western (genre) films
1937 Western (genre) films
Monogram Pictures films
Films directed by Robert N. Bradbury
American black-and-white films
1930s American films